Richard Henry Boyle, 6th Earl of Shannon (15 May 1860 - 1906) was a politician in Canada's Northwest Territories. He served as a member of the Legislative Assembly of the Northwest Territories from 1885 to 1887.

Early life
Boyle was the son of Henry Boyle, 5th Earl of Shannon and Lady Blanche Emma Lascelles.

Political career
Boyle ran for a seat to the Legislative Assembly of the Northwest Territories in the 1885 Northwest Territories election. He defeated candidate George C. Ives to become the first Member for the new electoral district of Macleod. Boyle did not serve a full term in office before resigning, vacating his seat in 1887.

References

1860 births
1906 deaths
Members of the Legislative Assembly of the Northwest Territories
Richard
People educated at Stubbington House School
British emigrants to Canada
Canadian people of Anglo-Irish descent
Earls of Shannon